The British Academy Children and Young People Award for Animation is an award presented annually by the British Academy of Film and Television Arts (BAFTA). It is given to "animated content for children and young people six and over". It was first awarded at the 1st edition of the British Academy Children's Awards in 1996, with Welsh claymation-style series Gogs being the first recipient of the award.

Cartoon Network series The Amazing World of Gumball holds the record of most wins in the category with four, followed by Shaun the Sheep with two. The two shows are the only programs to win the award more than once. The Amazing World of Gumball is also the most nominated series with eight nominations for the award, followed by Shaun the Sheep with seven and Grizzly Tales for Gruesome Kids and Strange Hill High with three each.

Winners Yr Enwog Ffred, Room on the Broom and Revolting Rhymes, and nominee Robin Robin have also been nominated for the Academy Award for Best Animated Short Film. Additionally, Yr Enwog Ffred was also nominated for the BAFTA Award for Best Short Animation.

Winners and nominees

1990s

2000s

2010s

2020s

Note: The series that don't have recipients on the tables had Production team credited as recipients for the award or nomination.

Multiple wins

Multiple nominations

References

External links
Official website

Animation